(ha), is a syllable in the Javanese script which represent the sound /ɦɔ/ or /ɦa/. The letter can also represent a null consonant, in which it would be pronounced as /ɔ/ or /a/. It is commonly transliterated to Latin as "ha" or "a" and sometimes as "ho" and "o".

Pasangan 
The letter's pasangan is one of six which are located on the right hand side of previous syllable, making it possible to stack two pasangans without the use of pangkon.

Extended form 
 doesn't have a murda form.

Final consonant 
 has a syllable-final form called wignyan which replaces ha-pangkon combination.

Glyphs

Orthography 

  in front of a word is always transliterated as "a", except for foreign loan words. The same rule applies when sandhangan swara (vowel diacritics) is used.
 Read as "a":  - aku (me),  - ora (not),  - ilang (lost)
 Read as "ha":  - haji (hajj),  - hotèl,  - hikmat (wisdom)
 (Whether a word is considered a native Javanese or not will depend on the dictionary definition.)
  in the middle of a word is almost always transliterated as "ha".
  - tahu (tofu), not tau
  - ra-hayu (blessed), not rah-ayu (from rootword  ayu (beauty))
 With the exception
 Certain words such as  - maos (reading) or  - kaos (shirt)
 Words that end with "a" and has suffix -a, such as  - ana-a (let there be)
 Reduplicated word, where  in the beginning of the second word always transliterated as "a"
 In root word that ends with /h/ sound (in this sense, using wignyan) and has suffix (-i, -an, etc.),  (as in "ha") is added before the suffix.
  - panembah-han (to address a royalty), from the rootword  - nembah (to bow, to respect)
 Rootwords that ends with vowel sound and has suffix -ake, its suffix is written as 
  - katamtokaké (have been chosen), not katamtokhaké, from the rootword  - tamtu - (certain)
  are added in front of rootwords with prefix ng-, ny-, m-, and n-, although this is not mandatory.
  - ngandika (said), not hangandika nor angandika
 Rootword that starts with  if added prefix pi- or pri-, the syllable  became  (ya)
  - piyagem, from root word  - agem.

Unicode block 

Javanese script was added to the Unicode Standard in October, 2009 with the release of version 5.2.

References 

Javanese script